KZFW-LD, VHF digital and virtual channel 6, is a low-powered Aliento-affiliated television station licensed to Dallas, Texas, United States. The station transmits a directional signal towards Dallas, so as to not interfere with nearby KBFW-LD (also on channel 6), which covers Fort Worth.

The station is what is colloquially known as a "Franken-FM" station - a television station that is used as an FM radio station. This is due to the FM broadcast band being located adjacent to the VHF spectrum. As such, television stations that broadcast analog audio on channel 6 can be picked up by FM radios that tune to 87.7 MHz.

External links

Spanish-language television stations in Texas
Television channels and stations established in 1986
ZFW-LP
1986 establishments in Texas
Low-power television stations in the United States